Farid Zablith Filho (born August 5, 1942 in São Paulo) is a former Olympic breaststroke swimmer from Brazil, who participated at two Summer Olympics for his native country.

At the 1959 Pan American Games in Chicago, he finished 7th in the 200 metre breaststroke.

At the 1960 Summer Olympics in Rome, he swam the 200-metre breaststroke and the 4×100-metre medley, not reaching the finals.

At the 1963 Pan American Games, in São Paulo, he finished 4th in the 4×100-metre medley, and 5th in the 100-metre breaststroke.

At the 1964 Summer Olympics in Tokyo, he swam the 200-metre breaststroke and the 4×100-metre medley, not reaching the finals.

References

1943 births
Living people
Swimmers from São Paulo
Brazilian male breaststroke swimmers
Swimmers at the 1959 Pan American Games
Swimmers at the 1960 Summer Olympics
Swimmers at the 1963 Pan American Games
Swimmers at the 1964 Summer Olympics
Olympic swimmers of Brazil
Pan American Games competitors for Brazil
20th-century Brazilian people